An imidazopyridine is a nitrogen containing heterocycle that is also a class of drugs that contain this same chemical substructure. In general, they are GABAA receptor agonists, however recently proton pump inhibitors, aromatase inhibitors, NSAIDs and other classes of drugs in this class have been developed as well. Despite usually being similar to them in effect, they are not chemically related to benzodiazepines. As such, GABAA-agonizing imidazopyridines, pyrazolopyrimidines, and cyclopyrrones are sometimes grouped together and referred to as "nonbenzodiazepines." Imidazopyridines include:

Sedatives 
Anxiolytics, sedatives and hypnotics (GABAA receptor positive allosteric modulators):
 Imidazo[1,2-a]pyridines:
 Alpidem (original brand name Ananxyl)—an anxiolytic that was withdrawn from the market worldwide in 1995 due to hepatotoxicity.
 DS-1—a GABAA receptor positive allosteric modulator selective for the α4β3δ subtype, which is not targeted by other GABAergics such as benzodiazepines or other nonbenzodiazepines.
 Necopidem—an anxiolytic. It has not found clinical use.
 Saripidem—a sedative and anxiolytic. It is not used clinically.
 TP-003—a subtype-selective partial agonist at GABAA receptors, binding to GABAA receptor complexes bearing either α2, α3 or α5 subunits, but only showing significant efficacy at α3.
 Zolpidem (original brand name Ambien)—a widely used hypnotic. Generic versions are widely available.
 Imidazo[4,5-c]pyridines:
 Bamaluzole—a GABAA receptor-agonizing anticonvulsant that was never marketed.

Antipsychotic 
Antipsychotics:
 Imidazo[1,2-a]pyridines:
 Mosapramine (brand name クレミン, Cremin)—an atypical antipsychotic used in Japan.

Gastrointestinal 
Drugs used for peptic ulcer disease (PUD), GERD and gastroprokinetic agents (motility stimulants):
 Imidazo[1,2-a]pyridines:
 CJ-033466—an experimental gastroprokinetic acting as a selective 5-HT4 serotonin receptor partial agonist.
 Zolimidine—a gastroprotective agent.
 Linaprazan—a potassium-competitive acid blocker which demonstrated similar efficacy as esomeprazole in healing and controlling symptoms of GERD patients with erosive esophagitis.
 SCH28080—the prototypical potassium-competitive acid blocker which has not found clinical use because of liver toxicity in animal trials and elevated liver enzyme activity in the serum of human volunteers.
 Imidazo[4,5-b]pyridines:
 Tenatoprazole—it blocks the gastric proton pump leading to decline of gastric acid production.

Anti-inflammatories 
NSAIDs, analgesics and antimigraine drugs:
 Imidazo[1,2-a]pyridines:
 Miroprofen—a derivative of propionic acid.
 Imidazo[4,5-b]pyridines:
 Telcagepant—a calcitonin gene-related peptide receptor antagonist which was in clinical trials as a remedy for migraine. Its development was terminated.

Cardiovascular 
Drugs acting on the cardiovascular system:
 Imidazo[1,2-a]pyridines:
 Olprinone (loprinone)—a cardiac stimulant.

Bone 
Drugs for treatment of bone diseases:
 Imidazo[1,2-a]pyridines:
 Minodronic acid (brand names Bonoteo, Recalbon)—a third-generation bisphosphonate used for the treatment of osteoporosis.

Antineoplastic 
Antineoplastic agents:
 Imidazo[1,5-a]pyridines:
 Fadrozole (brand name Afema)—an aromatase inhibitor.
 Imidazo[4,5-c]pyridines:
 3-Deazaneplanocin A—an S-adenosyl-L-homocysteine synthesis inhibitor and histone methyltransferase EZH2 inhibitor.

Antiviral 
Directly-acting antiviral agents:

 Imidazo[1,2-a]pyridines:
 Tegobuvir (GS-9190) - an allosteric, non-nucleoside hepatitis C virus NS5B RNA-dependent RNA polymerase inhibitor targeting the thumb II allosteric site.

DAergic
PIP3EA [885446-91-3] D4 agonist supported to have penile erectant properties.

References

External links

 
Chemical classes of psychoactive drugs